In the Canadian Forces, Maritime Forces Pacific (MARPAC) is responsible for the fleet training and operational readiness of the Royal Canadian Navy in the Pacific Ocean. It was once referred to as Canadian Pacific Station.

The commander of Maritime Forces Pacific (COMMARPAC) is also the commander of Joint Task Force Pacific (COMMJTFP), holding the rank of rear admiral. COMMJTFP is responsible for all Canadian Forces operations (such as search and rescue or disaster aid) in British Columbia and its adjacent territorial waters. Reporting to the commander is the commander of Canadian Fleet Pacific (COMCANFLTPAC), holding the rank of commodore. This officer commands Canadian Fleet Pacific (CANFLTPAC), and is responsible for the operation and readiness of all warships, auxiliaries and support vessels.

MARPAC facilities
MARPACHQ is at CFB Esquimalt in Esquimalt, British Columbia, near Victoria.

 
 NOTC Venture

Whiskey 601 is the regularly used name for an often used naval weapons exercise area off the west coast of Canada. The area's official title was "W-601".  The name was usually shortened to "Whiskey" by sailors in the Royal Canadian Navy. Whiskey 601 was notorious for rough seas and bad weather. Whiskey 601 was decommissioned as an exercise area in the 1990s.

MARPAC units
 Canadian Fleet Pacific
 Frigates
  
   
  
  
  
  Coastal defence vessels
  
  
  
  
  
  
 Submarines
  
  
  
Patrol and training vessels
  Orca-class patrol vessel
 CFB Esquimalt
 Fleet Maintenance Facility Cape Breton
 Fleet Diving Unit (Pacific) 
 Naden Band of the Royal Canadian Navy
 Naval Officers Training Centre Venture
 Naval Training Development Centre (Pacific) 
 CFAD Rocky Point
Naval Radio Section Aldergrove
Canadian Forces Maritime Experimental and Test Ranges

The RCAF unit 443 Maritime Helicopter Squadron is part of 12 Wing Shearwater but is headquartered at Patricia Bay near CFB Esquimalt and works closely with MARPAC. The squadron provides the onboard helicopter detachments for CANFLTPAC ships.

After World War II to prior to Unification in 1968 the RCN's Pacific Command assignments:

 Fleet squadrons
 Second Canadian Escort Squadron – assigned with escort destroyers
 Second Canadian Minesweeping Squadron – minesweepers paid off 1960s or as training vessels in 1990s
 Fourth Canadian Escort Squadron – assigned with (escort) frigates 
 Special Duties – assigned maintenance ship, trainer submarine  and training ship 
 Naval air squadrons
 VU-32 Utility Squadron – assigned various fixed-wing and rotary aircraft:
 Grumman TBF Avenger – anti-submarine (A/S) patrol
 Beechcraft Expeditor – navigation training and short-range transport
 De Havilland Canada built Grumman Tracker CS2F – A/S patrol
 Lockheed Silver Star – jet trainers
 Douglas Dakota – utility transport and other roles
 Bell Twin Huey – assigned after Unification in 1970–1971

See also

 Maritime Forces Atlantic

References

External links
 

Pacific
Pacific Ocean
Military units and formations established in the 1970s